Henicopsaltria danielsi, commonly known as the McIvor River grinder, is a large species of cicada found near Cooktown in northeastern Australia.

References

External links

Hemiptera of Australia
Insects described in 1993
Arenopsaltriini